Stanley Leroy Hall (August 14, 1888 – August 21, 1962) was a Canadian politician, who represented Halton in the Legislative Assembly of Ontario from 1943 to 1962 as a Progressive Conservative member.

Provincial Office
Hall was elected in the general election in 1943 and re-elected in the general elections in 1945, 1948, 1951, 1955 and 1959. He served as a backbench member of the George A. Drew, Thomas Laird Kennedy, Leslie Frost and John Robarts majority Progressive Conservative governments and, during each term in office, he served on an average of seven Standing Committees. He died, in office, in 1962. His election marked the beginning of a Progressive Conservative hold on the riding (now known as Burlington that continued to 2014.

References

External links 
 

1888 births
1962 deaths
Progressive Conservative Party of Ontario MPPs